OT1 (aka TeX text) is a 7-bit TeX encoding developed by Donald E. Knuth.

Character set

See also 
OML encoding
OMS encoding

References 

Character sets